The  2015 Beijing Guoan F.C. season  was their 12th consecutive season in the Chinese Super League, established in the 2004, and 25th consecutive season in the top flight of Chinese football. They competed in the Chinese Super League, AFC Champions League and Chinese FA Cup.

Players

First team squad
As of 18 July 2015

Reserve squad

Out on loan

Club

Coaching staff

Transfers

Winter

In:

 

Out:

Summer

In:

Out:

Friendlies

Pre-season

Competitions

Chinese Super League

Matches

Chinese FA Cup

AFC Champions League

Play-off round

Group stage

Knock-out stage

Round of 16

References

Beijing Guoan F.C. seasons
Chinese football clubs 2015 season